Alatyr is the name of several inhabited localities in Russia.

Urban localities
Alatyr, Chuvash Republic, a town in the Chuvash Republic

Rural localities
Alatyr, Nizhny Novgorod Oblast, a village under the administrative jurisdiction of the town of oblast significance of Pervomaysk in Nizhny Novgorod Oblast

See also
Alatyrsky District